Klek is a settlement in the Municipality of Trbovlje in central Slovenia. It was established in 2014. It is included with the rest of the municipality in the Central Sava Statistical Region.

History
Klek was administratively separated from Prapreče and Trbovlje in 2013 and made a settlement in its own right.

Church
The local church is dedicated to the Holy Cross and belongs to the Parish of Trbovlje–St. Martin, part of the Diocese of Celje.

References

External links

Klek on Geopedia

Populated places in the Municipality of Trbovlje
2013 establishments in Slovenia
Populated places established in 2013